Joseph Gilles Dominic Lavoie (born November 21, 1967) is a Canadian-born Austrian former professional ice hockey player. Lavoie played 38 games in the National Hockey League between 1988 and 1994 for the St. Louis Blues, Ottawa Senators, Boston Bruins and Los Angeles Kings. He scored five goals and thirteen points, collecting 32 penalty minutes. The rest of his career, which lasted from 1987 to 2004 and briefly from 2010 to 2011, was mainly spent in the International Hockey League and later in Austria and Germany. Internationally Lavoie, who became a naturalized Austrian citizen, represented the Austrian national team at the 1998 and 2002 Winter Olympics, as well as at four World Championships.

Biography
As a youth, he played in the 1980 Quebec International Pee-Wee Hockey Tournament with a minor ice hockey team from Richelieu, Quebec.

The Montreal native played junior with the QMJHL's St-Jean Castors. He was signed as a free agent by the St. Louis Blues and was a part-time skater for four years. He spent most of his time with the IHL's Peoria Rivermen where he contributed to a Turner Cup championship in 1991. Lavoie was one of the best offensive blueliners in the league with four straight years of at least 40 points and selection to the first and second all-star teams once each.

He also toiled briefly for the Ottawa Senators, Boston Bruins, and L.A. Kings (where his only 3 goals were in a hat trick versus the Detroit Red wings In A 10-3 Victory in October 1993) before heading to Europe. Beginning in 1994–95 he played five years with VEU Feldkirch of the Austrian League then signed with Germany's Hannover in 1999. Lavoie also lent his expertise to the Austrian team at the 1999 and 2000 World Championships and he finished the 7th best scorer during the 1998 Olympics in Nagano.

Lavoie is now retired and resides in El Dorado Hills, California, and has four children.

Career statistics

Regular season and playoffs

International

References

External links
 

1967 births
Living people
Boston Bruins players
Canadian expatriate ice hockey players in Germany
Canadian ice hockey defencemen
Hannover Scorpions players
Ice hockey players at the 1998 Winter Olympics
Ice hockey players at the 2002 Winter Olympics
Los Angeles Kings players
New Haven Senators players
Olympic ice hockey players of Austria
Ottawa Senators players
Peoria Rivermen (IHL) players
Phoenix Roadrunners (IHL) players
Providence Bruins players
Saint-Jean Castors players
San Diego Gulls (IHL) players
Ice hockey people from Montreal
St. Louis Blues players
Undrafted National Hockey League players
VEU Feldkirch players